The traethodl is a Welsh verse form consisting of couplets in which seven-syllabled lines rhyme with alternate accented and unaccented rhyming syllables. It is first attested in medieval Welsh literature. With the addition of cynghanedd, it was elaborated in the 14th century and developed into the cywydd.

See also
Welsh poetry

Footnotes

Welsh poetry
Medieval Welsh literature
Welsh-language literature
Western medieval lyric forms